The Miss Switzerland 2009 pageant was held on September 26, 2008. There were 16 candidates representing the cantons of the country that were competing for the national crown. The winner will enter in Miss Universe 2009 and Miss World 2009. Not all the contestants came from the canton they were originally from.

Candidates

References

External links
Candidates

Miss Switzerland
2008 beauty pageants
2008 in Switzerland